The Chicago metropolitan area has a large Indian American population. As of 2010, there are 171,901 Indian Americans living in the Chicago area, making it the most populous Asian subgroup in the metropolitan area and the second-largest Indian American population of metropolitan areas in the US, after the Indians in the New York City metropolitan area. Within the metropolitan area, the towns of South Barrington, Schaumburg, Oak Brook, Buffalo Grove, Naperville, and Morton Grove have the six highest concentrations of South Asian Americans. Chicago, Naperville, Lincolnwood, Aurora, Skokie, and Hoffman Estates have the highest absolute numbers of South Asian Americans.Devon Avenue in Chicago is also noted for having a large number of Indian and Pakistani restaurants. and is home to the first location of Patel Brothers, the largest Indian grocery chain in the United States.

Notable Indian-Americans from the Chicago area 
 Jay Chandrasekhar, film director
 Raja Krishnamoorthi, U.S. representative from Illinois's 8th congressional district
 Ameya Pawar, former Chicago City Council alderman and first Asian American member of the Chicago City Council
 Danny Pudi, actor
Prashanth Venkataramanujam, head writer and executive producer for Patriot Act with Hasan Minhaj

See also

References 

Asian-American culture in Chicago
American people of Indian descent
Ethnic groups in Chicago
Indian-American culture by city
Indian-American culture in Illinois
South Asian American culture